On 19 July 2018, a 56-year-old woman named Low Hwee Geok (刘惠玉 Líu Huìyù), also known as Michelle Low, was attacked and stabbed at the carpark area of ITE College Central. The attacker, who was Low's ex-husband Seet Cher Hng (薛泽元 Xuē Zéyuán), had attempted suicide after stabbing his ex-wife eight times, but he was taken to hospital by the police and he survived his wounds. Low, on the other hand, died from the cold-blooded attack, resulting in Seet being arrested and charged with murder. Seet, who had a gambling habit, had been harassing his wife for several years after their divorce for more money due to his allegations that his share of their condominium's sale proceeds was not fairly distributed. Three years later, Seet, then 69 years old, was found guilty of murdering Low by the High Court on 14 September 2021. Eight days later, Seet was sentenced to life imprisonment on 22 September 2022.

Background
Seet Cher Hng, who had one sister in his family, was born in 1952. Upon reaching adulthood, Seet married twice in his life. He married his first wife in 1981 and they had a son, before subsequently, the couple divorced on an unspecified date. When Seet's former wife from his first marriage was approached by the media in 2018, she only revealed she did not contact Seet for all these years since their divorce and never wanted to have anything to do with him, but she refused to divulge further details about her life with Seet and their separation, implying that their marriage and separation was an unhappy and painful one.

Later, Seet met Low Hwee Geok when he was still employed in the training programme at Institute of Technical Education (ITE), and despite their age gap of ten years, Seet and Low fell in love and they married on 7 April 1993, and they had one daughter (aged 18 in 2018) together. Seet, however, had a compulsive addiction to gambling, and he often stole his wife's money to feed his gambling habit and also raked up huge debts from gambling, and this being the assumed reason why his first wife divorced him. As his debts grew bigger, Low got wind of her husband's gambling habit, and still, out of consideration for their daughter and her belief that Seet would repent and quit gambling, she remained by her side and even helped pay off part of his debt. However, Seet persisted in his old ways despite his wife's tries to dissuade him from gambling.

During a 2008 family trip to Macau, when Seet disappeared to roam the local casinos to gamble, Low finally decided to open up and told her family members about Seet's gambling habits. After the advice and persuasion from her relatives, Low decided to divorce Seet, and the divorce request was finalized and granted on 13 June 2011. The couple's condominium at Corporation Road was sold off and the proceeds were divided between Low and Seet. Seet retired on 30 June 2017 and was relying on his monthly Central Provident Fund (CPF) payouts.

Seet was unhappy with his shares of the proceeds despite having confirmed the finalization of his and Low's shares. Seet, who did not reflect on his mistakes, blamed Low for being unfaithful to him and had caused them to divorce in the first place; the allegations of Low's infidelity was proven false. Also, Seet himself needed money to continue to gamble. Between 2011 and 2018, he kept sending e-mails, which contained numerous demands to Low for money.

Death of Low Hwee Geok

Premeditation
As a result of his anger and hatred towards his former wife, Seet Cher Hng decided to confront Low Hwee Geok, and intended to kill her. He prepared to commit suicide once he killed Low, should Low did not agree to give him the money he demanded from her. On 19 July 2018, the date he executed his plot to attack Low, Seet armed himself with three knives, one of them engraved with "010609" and "020609", which allegedly represented dates of Low's infidelity. He also penned a total of four suicide notes to his daughter, sister, a friend and to the police between April and July 2018, in which some excerpts of these letters were revealed in court during Seet's 2021 murder trial. One of these notes, addressed to Seet's daughter, was quoted to have said, "I took your mummy (Low) for hurting Daddy (Seet)."

According to the prosecutor Hay Hung Chun (who prosecuted Seet for Low's murder), Seet's four letters conveyed a "palpable sense of resignation, finality and fatality", and these notes portrayed Seet as "a man who had finally screwed his courage to the sticking place after years of prevarication." These notes also demonstrated the intention Seet had harboured all along to engineer the death of his ex-wife.

Stabbing of Low and Seet's suicide attempt
On 19 July 2018, 66-year-old Seet Cher Hng rented a car and he headed to the carpark of ITE College Central, where Low was working as the examinations director. He arrived at about 4.40pm and thus stayed inside his vehicle, waiting for Low to appear as he intended to attack her once she entered her car. Seet waited for three hours before he finally saw Low approaching her car. As Low got into her car, Seet got in on the passenger side and confronted his wife.

Upon the sight of her former husband, Low screamed loudly, and Seet held one of her arms. Low managed to exit the car, but immediately lost her footing and fell. Seeing that Low had collapsed, Seet charged towards Low and brandished his three knives, and proceeded to stab Low eight times. Seet then stabbed himself 13 times and collapsed. Several passers-by arrived due to them getting wind of the commotion, and called the police and ambulance. While Seet was rushed to hospital, 56-year-old Low Hwee Geok was pronounced dead at the scene by paramedics of the Singapore Civil Defence Force (SCDF). An autopsy report revealed that Low died as a result of three fatal wounds to the left sides of her chest, mid-back and lower back respectively, and each of these wounds alone was sufficient to cause death.

Meanwhile, Seet, who sustained grievous abdominal injuries, was rushed to the hospital, where he was treated with surgery and he survived. He was later placed at the intensive care unit (ICU) until his discharge from hospitalization on 25 July 2018. By then, he was placed under arrest for killing Low.

Reactions to Low's death
The murder of Low brought shock to many students and staff members (including Low's colleagues) of ITE College Central. They offered condolences to Low's family, and some of Low's colleagues showed acknowledgement for Low's exceptional professionalism in her job and her profound influence on her students. The parents of the students were reassured by the staff about the security and safety of the school due to the case being an isolated incident not related to the school, and classes took place as per normal in the aftermath of the murder.

Several believers and a pastor of the church where Low frequented to for two years also showed sadness and shock for what happened to Low. Low, who originally came from a family full of Confucianist values, converted to Christianity on 25 December 2017 at the church and often went there with her daughter to make prayers, and she was known to be a gentle and good natured person who was committed to her new religion. After her 18-year-old daughter recovered her body, Low's funeral was conducted and it was attended by 15 of her family members and friends. At the time of her death, Low, who was the seventh of eight daughters in her family, left behind seven sisters, a mother and her 18-year-old daughter. Seet's first ex-wife also expressed her extreme shock over the death of Low, with whom she only met once.

Fate of Seet Cher Hng

Arrest and conviction
During his hospitalization, 66-year-old Seet Cher Hng was placed under arrest and charged with the murder of 56-year-old Low Hwee Geok. As the charge Seet faced was that of premeditated murder with intention to kill under Section 300(a) of the Penal Code (also the most serious of all four degrees of murder under Singapore law), Seet would be sentenced to death if he was found guilty of this particular offence. Seet spent a total of three years in remand awaiting trial, and a psychiatric assessment revealed that Seet was not suffering from any major psychiatric disorder at the time of the stabbing, and was mentally fit to plead and stand trial.

In August 2021, the prosecution amended the original charge of intentional murder to a lesser murder charge under Section 300(c) of the Penal Code. This lesser charge dictates an offence of murder by intentionally inflicting an injury that could sufficiently result in death. A month after the amendment of the charge sheet, Seet was officially brought to trial on 14 September 2021 for the murder of Low. By then, Seet expressed his intention to plead guilty to the amended charge and did not wish to give evidence. According to his lawyer Wendell Wong, who described the case as a "painful family tragedy", Seet had taken "paramount consideration" to plead guilty so as to prevent his daughter and family from "reliving the tragedy". After an hour of hearing the case and receiving Seet's plea of guilt, the High Court convicted Seet of murdering Low. The sentencing trial of Seet was scheduled to take place eight days later on 22 September.

Sentence
During the submissions on sentence, Deputy Public Prosecutor Hay Hung Chun, who was in charge of the prosecution, did not seek the death penalty, which was the maximum punishment any offender would face in Singapore for murder by an intentional injury resulting in death. The only other punishment for this charge was life imprisonment, which the prosecution did not object to when they expressed they would leave the sentence to the trial court's discretion.

Wendell Wong, Seet's defence lawyer, argued that Seet should be sentenced to life in prison. Wong highlighted Seet's grievances about their divorce in 2011; Seet sought to cast blame on Low for breaking up their marriage and dismissing his financial demands. However, the trial judge Aedit Abdullah of the High Court harshly reprimanded Wong for emphasising his mitigation plea on the numerous false allegations which Seet raised regarding the supposed financial disputes he had with Low. Justice Aedit also pointed out that the matter raised in mitigation was irrelevant to sentencing, and that with the victim being dead, she was not given a voice to tell her side of the story regarding the monetary issues that Seet brought forward against her in his unproven assertions. He also stated that this amounted to an abuse of the mitigation plea process as it was "not a forum for airing of grievances", since the mitigation plea was meant for judges to consider only the relevant factors of the case in order to decide between the sentence of life imprisonment and the death penalty for the offender.

Aside from his verbal remarks against Wong's conduct, Justice Aedit took note that the killing of Low was deplorable in nature, and that the defendant had no right to justify his crime, deflect himself of his blame, and attempt to reduce his culpability or seriousness of the crime, regardless of the reasons he made up or the grievances he harboured over the personal issues between himself and Low. Nonetheless, Justice Aedit found there were insufficient grounds in Seet's case which would have deserved the death penalty, given that in accordance to the Kho Jabing appeal ruling, the death penalty was strictly reserved to the most serious cases of murder where an offender, despite falling short of the intention to kill, exhibited viciousness and/or a blatant disregard for human life, as well as sparking an outrage of the community's feelings when committing the said murder. The judge also stated that since the prosecution did not oppose to a life term, it would be "rare indeed for the court to impose a sentence not sought by any party to the proceedings."

As a result, on 22 September 2021 (eight days after his conviction), 69-year-old Seet Cher Hng was sentenced to life imprisonment for Low's murder. Since the end of his sentencing trial, Seet is currently serving his life sentence at Changi Prison.

Aftermath
In 2019, a year after the murder, there were considerations to implement more efficient security measures to tackle the safety lapses at all educational institutions in Singapore, as a result of the ITE College Central murder and several other on-campus incidents involving violence at schools.

After the end of Seet Cher Hng's sentencing in 2021, due to Seet's remorseless and baseless claims in court, Low Hwee Geok's sixth elder sister Stella Dumont (née Low) stepped up to express to the media that Seet's assertions of her second-youngest sister's alleged infidelity were not true, as the divorce was mainly perpetuated by Seet's incorrigible gambling habit and she laid out the instances where Seet actually took money without her sister's permission to feed his gambling habit, Seet not objecting to the finalization of the shares distributed between the couple and that Seet had met up with Low two years after their divorce to clarify and settle some of Seet's concerns about the monetary matters. Victor Dumont, the husband of Stella, also stepped up to defend his late sister-in-law, stating that Seet, who had spent his money on gambling, kept harassing Low not out of his need to settle the shares but purely to get more money to continue to gamble. It was also revealed that the Dumonts became the legal guardians of Low's daughter after her mother's murder and her father's arrest for his atrocity.

The ITE College Central murder also brought renewed attention to several other high-profile cases where it involved family-related homicides committed in Singapore within the past few years. One of these cases included the 2017 Woodlands double murders, in which property agent Teo Ghim Heng received the death penalty for the premeditated murders of his daughter and pregnant wife eight days before Chinese New Year.

See also
 2018 in Singapore
 Woodlands double murders
 Life imprisonment in Singapore
 Capital punishment in Singapore
 List of major crimes in Singapore (2000–present)
 List of major crimes in Singapore (before 2000)

References

Murder in Singapore
2018 murders in Singapore
2018 in Singapore
Female murder victims
Deaths by stabbing
Deaths by stabbing in Singapore
Life imprisonment in Singapore
Singaporean prisoners sentenced to life imprisonment
Prisoners sentenced to life imprisonment by Singapore
Violence against women in Singapore